Pat Kelly (10 May 1923 – 10 February 1999) was an Australian rules footballer who played for North Melbourne  in the Victorian Football League (VFL).

References

External links

North Melbourne Football Club players
Australian rules footballers from Victoria (Australia)
1923 births
1999 deaths